Louis I of Chalon-Arlay (1337–1366) was the second son of John II lord of Arlay and Margaret of Male.

When his father died in 1362, his elder brother Hugh II lord of Arlay inherited the Lordship of Arlay and Louis became Lord of Arguel and Ciuseaux.

Louis died during the Savoyard crusade.

Marriage and issue 
Louis was married to Margaret of Vienne, daughter of Philippe de Vienne, Seigneur de Pymont. His son 
 John III inherited the lordship of Arlay from Hugo II in 1377 and married Mary of Baux-Orange, who was the heiress of the Principality of Orange.

References

Sources

Lords of France
Chalon-Arlay
1337 births
1366 deaths
14th-century French people
Counts of Chalon